Presidential elections were held in Colombia on 1 May 1966. Under the National Front agreement, it was the turn of the Liberal Party to govern, and so all candidates were members of the party. The result was a victory for Carlos Lleras Restrepo, who received 71.8% of the vote.

Results

References

Presidential elections in Colombia
1966 in Colombia
Colombia